Waldemar Jan Dubaniowski (born 23 February 1964 in Warsaw) is a Polish government official and diplomat; currently serving as an ambassador of Poland to Thailand, Laos, Cambodia, and Myanmar; a former member of the National Broadcasting Council; and a former Chief of the Cabinet of the President of Poland and Secretary of State in the Chancellery of the President of the Republic of Poland. He was also an ambassador of Poland to Singapore.

Biography 
He graduated from the Institute of Social Sciences from Warsaw University. He became a graduate of the National School of Public Administration in 1993. He completed a postgraduate course at Warsaw School of Economics in foreign trade in 1997.

In the first half of the 1990s, he worked as an assistant secretary at the Ministry of Industry and Commerce, then in the Office of Government Plenipotentiary for European Integration and Foreign Assistance and Economic Committee of Council of Ministers. During 1996–1998, he served as the Group Director of the Cabinet of the President of the Republic of Poland. Until 2003, he was a member of the National Broadcasting Council. During 2005, he was the Chief of the Cabinet of the President of Poland.

From 2003 to 2009 he was the President of Polish Tennis Association.

In 2008, he was appointed an ambassador of the Republic of Poland to Singapore. He took this post in March 2009. As the ambassador to Singapore, he was also the Governor for Poland at Asia-Europe Foundation. In November 2013, he completed his mission and departed the post in Singapore.

In 2014 he was a director at PricewaterhouseCoopers in Warsaw. In the same year, he was appointed a member of the supervisory board of Polish State Railways.

In 2017, he was appointed an ambassador of the Republic of Poland to Thailand, Laos, Cambodia, and Myanmar, based in Bangkok. He took this post in September 2017.

In 2005 Dubaniowski was awarded the Officer's Cross of the Order of Polonia Restituta.

References 

1964 births
Living people
Ambassadors of Poland to Singapore
Ambassadors of Poland to Thailand
Officers of the Order of Polonia Restituta
University of Warsaw alumni
National School of Public Administration (Poland) alumni